Epermenia ruwenzorica is a moth in the family Epermeniidae. It was described by Reinhard Gaedike in 2013. It is found in Orientale Province of the Democratic Republic of the Congo.

References

Epermeniidae
Moths described in 2013
Lepidoptera of the Democratic Republic of the Congo
Moths of Africa